Alex Higgins (born 22 July 1981) is a former professional and semi-professional football player who last played for Northwich Victoria. He also played for Queens Park Rangers, Chester City, Stalybridge Celtic and Boston United.

He played for Boston United between 2002 and 2003, scoring his first professional goal in the process in an FA Cup defeat to Northampton Town. However he had issues with epilepsy at this time and even collapsed during a game as a result.

References

1981 births
Living people
Sheffield Wednesday F.C. players
English footballers
English Football League players
Queens Park Rangers F.C. players
Chester City F.C. players
Stalybridge Celtic F.C. players
Boston United F.C. players
Northwich Victoria F.C. players
Footballers from Sheffield
Association football midfielders